Positively Sick on 4th Street is the first full-length album by the punk rock band the Humpers.

Track listing
 "Murder City Revolution"
 "Up Yer Heart"
 "Psycho Repairman"
 "Hey Shadow"
 "Drunk Tank"
 "War Is Hell"
 "Rocket and the Retards"
 "Soul Surgeon"
 "Cops and Robbers"
 "Unsafe at Any Speed"
 "Zombie"
 "Insect Liberation"
 "Rocket Reducer No. 62 (Rama Lama Fa Fa Fa)"
 "Apocalypse Girl"
 "Death Threat Machine"

References

The Humpers albums
1993 debut albums